Nina Jankowicz (born ) is an American researcher and writer. She is the author of How to Lose the Information War (2020), on Russian use of disinformation as geopolitical strategy, and How to Be a Woman Online (2022), a handbook for fighting against online harassment of women. She briefly served as executive director of the newly created United States Department of Homeland Security (DHS)'s Disinformation Governance Board, resigning from the position amid the dissolution of the board by DHS in May 2022.

Career
A double-major in Russian and political science, Jankowicz graduated from Bryn Mawr College in 2011 and spent a semester at Herzen State Pedagogical University in Russia in 2010. In 2017, she was a Fulbright fellow in Kyiv, working with the foreign ministry of Ukraine. She has also served as a disinformation fellow at the Woodrow Wilson Center and as supervisor of the Russia and Belarus programs at the National Democratic Institute.

Writing

Jankowicz is the author of two books, in 2020 publishing How to Lose the Information War: Russia, Fake News and the Future of Conflict. In The New Yorker Joshua Yaffa called it "a persuasive new book on disinformation as a geopolitical strategy." Jankowicz examines Russian influence operations aimed at weakening democratic nations and thereby strengthening its own standing in international order. This proceeds via six case studies, one per chapter: Estonia, Georgia, Poland, Ukraine together with the Netherlands, Czech Republic, and the United States. She argues for media literacy, public awareness, and an educated electorate as the best means to guard against a disinformation campaign. 

In 2022, Jankowicz published How to be a Woman Online: Surviving Abuse and Harassment, and How to Fight Back. In it, she draws on statistics on online sexism and harassment of women, as well as on her own experience and that of journalist Nicole Perlroth, Guardian columnist Van Badham, and video game designer Brianna Wu. It is organized in five sections, dealing with online security, handling trolls, developing supportive communities, navigating social media, and repelling online harassment. A review in Publishers Weekly called it "strategic, focused, and eminently usable... an essential guide for women interested in standing up for a fairer, safer online world." Writing in The Diplomatic Courier, Joshua Huminski said that in addition to its usefulness as a how-to guide, reading about the experiences the book sets out to address also serves a second purpose: "forcing the reader to confront these very real and very uncomfortable questions" of why women face a "torrent of online abuse directed at them for the crime of... having their gender."

Jankowicz has also contributed to The Washington Post and The New York Times.

Disinformation Governance Board
In April 2022, Jankowicz was selected to head the newly formed Disinformation Governance Board of the United States Department of Homeland Security. The appointment drew primarily right-wing criticism of Jankowicz; National Review, the Washington Examiner, and the libertarian magazine Reason negatively evaluated her criticism of the Hunter Biden laptop story and her August 2020 praise of Christopher Steele (author of the Steele dossier, which the Examiner deemed "discredited"). Republican senator Josh Hawley criticized Jankowicz's "leftist radical" views on Twitter, and Republicans also criticized her past support of Democrats and her negative response to Elon Musk's then-standing offer to purchase of Twitter. In response, Jankowicz said that at least one of her tweets was "taken out of context". On CNN's State of The Union, U.S. Homeland Security Secretary Alejandro Mayorkas called Jankowicz "eminently qualified, a renowned expert in the field of disinformation", and "neutral". Progressive media watchdog Fairness & Accuracy in Reporting criticized mainstream media for focusing on right-wing criticism without considering potential left-wing objections to Jankowicz's appointment. Writing in The Nation, Lev Golinkin criticized Jankowicz's previous work with the Ukrainian fact-checking organization StopFake, which he accused of running "interference for violent neo-Nazi formations".

On May 18, The Washington Post reported that the board and its working groups would be shut down, pending review, citing failures by DHS to communicate with relevant Congressional entities, to respond to criticism of the board's name and its unclear mission, and to defend against right-wing criticism of Jankowicz. On May 17, 2022, DHS shut down the board, and Jankowicz officially resigned her DHS post the following day. A DHS spokesperson said, "Nina Jankowicz has been subjected to unjustified and vile personal attacks and physical threats." Robby Soave of Reason argued that Jankowicz's "faulty record" "doomed" the board. On July 10, Jankowicz appeared on Brian Stelter's Reliable Sources, during which she said that the board's purpose had been misrepresented by "Republicans" and the "far-left", calling the board a "victim of disinformation." She also complained of receiving "disproportionate" attention from the media.

Center for Information Resilience
In September 2022, Jankowicz announced the launch of The Hypatia Project, which she conducts at the UK-based Center for Information Resilience (CIR). The project aims to combat gendered abuse and disinformation online. As part of her work with CIR, which takes grants from the UK government, Jankowicz registered as a foreign agent in November 2022. She wrote in her registration that she "supervises research, executes business strategy, oversees the establishment of CIR's research, communicates with the media, and briefs individuals and officials on CIR's research."

Personal life

Jankowicz has an interest in musical theatre. She tweeted in 2021, "You can just call me the Mary Poppins of disinformation," and linked to a TikTok video of her singing "Supercalifragilisticexpialidocious" with lyrics modified to fit the topic of disinformation. She is a former member of the Wizard Rock band The Moaning Myrtles.

References

External links

 
 
 "How an expert on online disinformation and harassment became the target of both", Fresh Air interview, May 26, 2022

1980s births
Living people
United States Department of Homeland Security officials
Biden administration personnel
Bryn Mawr College alumni
Georgetown University alumni
Wizard rock musicians
20th-century American women
21st-century American women writers
Date of birth missing (living people)
Year of birth missing (living people)
Place of birth missing (living people)